Ballyhack may refer to:
 Ballyhack, County Wexford, Ireland
 Ballyhack, Newfoundland and Labrador, Canada 
 Informal local name for the Belfast suburb of Ballyhackamore